Park Gate is a historic home located near Nokesville, Prince William County, Virginia. It was built about 1750, and is a -story, three-bay, Tidewater Style frame dwelling. It has a steep gable roof and exterior end chimneys and measures 36 feet by 30 feet. The front facade features a 12 feet deep full width front porch. Colonel Thomas Lee, eldest son of Richard Henry Lee, signer of the Declaration of Independence, resided at Park Gate from about 1790 to 1805.

It was added to the National Register of Historic Places in 1987.

References

External links
Park Gate, State Route 653, Brentsville, Prince William County, VA: 1 photo at Historic American Buildings Survey

Historic American Buildings Survey in Virginia
Houses on the National Register of Historic Places in Virginia
Houses completed in 1750
Houses in Prince William County, Virginia
National Register of Historic Places in Prince William County, Virginia